Novonikolayevka is a rural locality (a selo) in Starooskolsky District, Belgorod Oblast, Russia. The population was 131 as of 2010. There are 5 streets.

Geography 
Novonikolayevka is located 40 km east of Stary Oskol (the district's administrative centre) by road. Znamenka is the nearest rural locality.

References 

Rural localities in Starooskolsky District